Kiya Husayn I, was the third ruler of the Afrasiyab dynasty, ruling from 1403 till an unknown date. He was the son and successor of Iskandar-i Shaykhi. Kiya Husayn was later succeeded by his son, Luhrasp.

Sources 
 

15th-century monarchs in the Middle East
15th-century Iranian people
15th-century deaths
Year of birth missing
Afrasiyab dynasty
Iranian slave owners